The TIA-102 series of documents delineate an American National Standard. The papers describe and define tests and test methodologies that can be used by land mobile radio systems (LMR) equipment developers and others to assess implementations of this functionality and its performance. They make up APCO Project 25.

TIA-102 concerns the functionality and performance necessary to enable inter-operable (i.e., multi-manufacturer) implementation of open interfaces, services, and features for digital Land Mobile Radio (LMR) equipment.  They are continuously evolving as a result of advancements in LMR technologies, emerging LMR operational needs, and other factors (e.g., LMR Service radio spectrum regulatory changes).

References

Telecommunications standards
Trunked radio systems